Michèle Laroque (born 15 June 1960) is a French actress, comedian, humorist, producer and screenwriter.

Early life 
Michèle Laroque was born in Nice in the department of Alpes-Maritimes. She is the daughter of Romanian dancer and violinist Doina Trandabur, who fled to France to escape Gheorghe Gheorghiu-Dej's regime in Communist Romania. Her father is French doctor Claude Laroque, who met Doina a year earlier during a tour. Michèle is also the niece of Pierre Laroque, the creator of Social Security in France. She studied economics and English, taking comedy classes at the same time in Antibes and then moving to America on a campus in Austin, Texas. In 1979, along with her best friend, she was victim of a car accident that resulted in two years of hospitalisation, a long convalescence and several months of reeducation. Following an extended coma and associated psychological trauma, she made the decision to become a comedian.

Career 

She made her television début in 1988 in the humorous programme La Classe hosted by Fabrice every evening on FR3, where she met Pierre Palmade, Muriel Robin and Jean-Marie Bigard.

In 1989, she had her first role in the film Suivez cet avion and later had small roles in Le Mari de la coiffeuse (1990) by Patrice Leconte and Une époque formidable... (1991) by Gérard Jugnot and also starring him in the main role. She was nominated for the César Awards for Best Supporting Actress in La Crise (1992) and Pédale douce (1996).

She joined Les Enfoirés and is a member for the special tours and spectacles for Les Restos du Cœur. She is also the spokesperson for the association Enfance et Partage.

In 2002, she was the voice of Captain Amelia in the French version of the animated film Treasure Planet. In 2007, she appeared in an advertisement for the game Brain Age 2: More Training in Minutes a Day! on Nintendo DS.

Personal life 
Michèle Laroque was married to theatre director Dominique Deschamps for a brief period and later divorced. She has a daughter named Oriane (born 12 July 1995), who acted alongside her mother in the film Hey Good Looking !

Since 2008 she has been in a relationship with politician François Baroin. Her tax exile in the USA ended in 2010, her partner becoming at that time the Budget Minister of France.

Michèle Laroque is 5' 7.5" (1.71 m) tall. She is a gay rights activist.

Theatre

Filmography

Box-office 

Movies starring Michèle Laroque with more than a million of entries in France.

References

External links

 

1960 births
Living people
French people of Romanian descent
French film actresses
French television actresses
French voice actresses
French humorists
People from Nice
French film producers
French television producers
Women television producers
French women film producers
21st-century French actresses
20th-century French actresses
French women screenwriters
French screenwriters
Women humorists